Pollmächer is a surname. Notable people with the surname include:

 Frank André Pollmächer (born 1983), German long-distance runner
 Anja Pollmächer (born 1985, Riesa), German sprinter

German-language surnames